Robert Alan Iannucci is a computer scientist. His areas of expertise include multiprocessing and embedded systems.  He earned his PhD at MIT in 1988 with a thesis titled "A dataflow/von Neumann hybrid architecture.".

He was first at IBM at the time of the mainframes, then at Exa Corporation, where he was a founder and Vice President of Product Marketing. In November 1995 he joined Digital Equipment Corporation as Cambridge Research Lab Director, and then went on to Compaq as Vice President of Corporate Research when DEC was acquired by Compaq. From May 2007, Iannucci was head of Nokia's Research Center heading laboratories in Beijing, Tokyo, Palo Alto, Cambridge MA, Cambridge UK, Germany, and Finland. On the first of January 2008 he became the new chief technology officer of Nokia. He was also the first member of the board who is not based in Finland, remaining in Palo Alto. In September 2008 he stepped down.

He now owns and runs the RAI Laboratory LLC.

In 2012 Robert Iannucci became the Director of the Cylab Mobility Research Center at Carnegie Mellon University Silicon Valley.

Bibliography

References

A list of Iannucci's published works
Homepage
Nokia biopic
Amateur radio license W6EI
RAI Laboratory LLC
Symbian-freak interview
Symbian-freak Iannucci to step down 30 Sep 2008
Techworld interview 26 Feb 2008
Computerworld 26 Feb 2008
Book "Multithreaded computer architecture: a summary of the state of the art"
PR Newswire 29 Nov 1995
Iannucci Bio Page, Cylab Mobility Research Center, Carnegie Mellon University

Massachusetts Institute of Technology alumni
American computer scientists
American chief technology officers
Businesspeople in software
American computer businesspeople
American computer programmers
Nokia people
Digital Equipment Corporation people
IBM employees
Amateur radio people
Living people
Year of birth missing (living people)